Eupha may refer to:

Eupha, horticultural trade name of the genus Eulophia
EUPHA, European Public Health Association